Sari Qomish-e Qeshlaq (also Romanized as Sārī Qomīsh-e Qeshlāq; also known as Sārī Qomīsh) is a village in Behi-e Feyzolah Beygi Rural District, in the Central District of Bukan County, West Azerbaijan Province, Iran. At the 2006 census, its population was 463, in 77 families.

References 

Populated places in Bukan County